Sweatman is a surname.

Notable people with the name include:

Arthur Sweatman (1834–1909), Canadian priest, archbishop, and the 3rd Primate of the Anglican Church of Canada
Dustin Sweatman, former lead singer of the Mark Trammell Quartet
Fraser Sweatman (1913–1991), Canadian figure skater who competed in pairs
Jo Sweatman (1872–1956), Australian painter
Margaret Sweatman (born 1953), Canadian writer
Alan Sweatman (1920–2012), of the Manitoba law firm Thompson Dorfman Sweatman
Wilbur Sweatman (1882–1961), American ragtime and dixieland jazz composer, bandleader, and clarinetist
Noel Sweatman (1928), Australian fireman best known for his actions during the Buckingham Department store fire, Anzac Day 1968

References